The 2016–17 New Hampshire Wildcats men's basketball team  represented the University of New Hampshire during the 2016–17 NCAA Division I men's basketball season. The Wildcats, led by 12th-year head coach Bill Herrion, played their home games at Lundholm Gym in Durham, New Hampshire as members of the America East Conference. They finished the season 20–12, 10–6 in America East play to finish in a tie for third place. As the No. 4 seed in the America East tournament, they defeated UMBC in the quarterfinals before losing to Vermont in the semifinals.

Previous season
The Wildcats finished the 2015–16 season 20–13, 11–5 in America East play to finish in a tie for third place. They defeated Binghamton in the quarterfinals of the America East tournament where they lost to Vermont. They received an invitation to the CollegeInsider.com Tournament where they defeated Fairfield before losing to Coastal Carolina in the second round.

Preseason 
New Hampshire was picked to finish second in the preseason America East poll. Tanner Leissner, Jr. was selected to the preseason All-America East team.

Departures

Incoming Transfers

2016 incoming recruits

Roster

Schedule and results

|-
!colspan=9 style=| Non-conference regular season

|-
!colspan=9 style=| America East regular season

|-
!colspan=9 style=| America East tournament

References

New Hampshire Wildcats men's basketball seasons
New Hampshire
Wild
Wild